A plum is both a type of tree and the fruit stemming from that tree.

Plum may also refer to:

Places
 Plum, Pennsylvania
 Plum, Texas
 Plum Township, Venango County, Pennsylvania
 Plum, New Caledonia

People
Given name
 Pelham Warner (nicknamed "Plum"; 1873–1963), British Test cricketer
 P. G. Wodehouse (nicknamed "Plum"; 1881–1975), British author and humorist
 Plum Johnson (born ?), Canadian writer and publisher
 Plum Lewis (1884–1976), South African cricketer
 Plum Mariko (born Mariko Umeda; 1967–1997), Japanese professional wrestler
 Plum Sykes (born 1969), British fashion writer and novelist

Surname
 Alois Plum (born 1935), German artist noted for working in mural and stained-glass mediums
 Amy Plum (born 1967),  American–French young-adult fiction writer
 Carol Plum-Ucci (born 1957), American young-adult novelist and essayist
 Ego Plum (born Ernesto Guerrero; 1975), American composer, musician, visual artist, and record producer
 Frederick Plum (1887–1932), American sports shooter and Olympic competitor
 Fred Plum (1924–2010), American neurologist
 Ivan Plum (born 1992), Croatian footballer
 Kelsey Plum (born 1994), American basketball player
 Kenneth R. Plum (born 1941), American politician
 Milt Plum (born 1935), American football quarterback
 Nigel Plum (born 1983), Australian Rugby League footballer
 Polly Plum (pseudonym of Mary Ann Colclough; 1836–1885), New Zealand feminist and social reformer
 Seth Plum (1899–1969), English international footballer
 Thelma Plum (born 1994), Indigenous Australian singer-songwriter

Fictional characters
 Nanny Plum, a character in the series Ben & Holly's Little Kingdom
 Professor Plum, a character in the game Cluedo (aka Clue)
 Stephanie Plum, protagonist of several novels by Janet Evanovich
 Victoria Plum, a children's literature character created by Angela Rippon

Other uses
 Plum (color)
 PLUM keyboard
 Plum-coloured starling, a bird in sub-Saharan Africa.
 Raisins, to which the word referred in pre-Victorian times.

See also
 Plumb (disambiguation)
 Plum Creek (disambiguation)
 Plum Island (disambiguation)
 Plumology (plumage science)